Lu Verne is a city in Humboldt and Kossuth counties in the U.S. state of Iowa. The population was 258 at the time of the 2020 census.

History
Lu Verne was platted in 1880. It was named after Luverne, Minnesota.

Lu Verne was formerly serviced by Iowa Highway 408, which was decommissioned in 1980.

Geography
Lu Verne is located at  (42.911638, -94.083618).

Demographics

2010 census
As of the census of 2010, there were 261 people, 117 households, and 72 families living in the city. The racial makeup of the city was 96.9% White, 1.5% Native American, 0.4% from other races, and 1.1% from two or more races. Hispanic or Latino of any race were 3.8% of the population.

There were 117 households, of which 28.2% had children under the age of 18 living with them, 42.7% were married couples living together, 11.1% had a female householder with no husband present, 7.7% had a male householder with no wife present, and 38.5% were non-families. 35.0% of all households were made up of individuals, and 19.6% had someone living alone who was 65 years of age or older. The average household size was 2.23 and the average family size was 2.76.

The median age in the city was 42.1 years. 23.4% of residents were under the age of 18; 5.7% were between the ages of 18 and 24; 23.4% were from 25 to 44; 27.5% were from 45 to 64; and 19.9% were 65 years of age or older. The gender makeup of the city was 47.9% male and 52.1% female.

2000 census
As of the census of 2000, there were 299 people, 131 households, and 85 families living in the city. The racial makeup of the city was 99.33% White, 0.33% Native American, and 0.33% from two or more races. Hispanic or Latino of any race were 0.33% of the population.

There were 131 households, out of which 28.2% had children under the age of 18 living with them, 50.4% were married couples living together, 9.9% had a female householder with no husband present, and 35.1% were non-families. 28.2% of all households were made up of individuals, and 14.5% had someone living alone who was 65 years of age or older. The average household size was 2.28 and the average family size was 2.78.

In the city, the population was spread out, with 22.7% under the age of 18, 9.4% from 18 to 24, 26.4% from 25 to 44, 22.1% from 45 to 64, and 19.4% who were 65 years of age or older. The median age was 38 years. For every 100 females, there were 104.8 males. For every 100 females age 18 and over, there were 102.6 males.

The median income for a household in the city was $30,625, and the median income for a family was $34,500. Males had a median income of $21,429 versus $20,000 for females. The per capita income for the city was $16,281. About 14.5% of families and 13.8% of the population were below the poverty line, including 23.0% of those under the age of eighteen and 6.3% of those 65 or over.

Education
Lu Verne Community School District serves the community. Since 2015, Lu Verne sends its secondary students to the Algona Community School District, which operates Algona Middle School and Algona High School.

From 1984 until 2015, the Lu Verne district grade-shared with Corwith–Wesley Community School District, which operated Corwith–Wesley–Lu Verne High School.

References

External links
 Corwith Wesley LuVerne Times

Cities in Iowa
Cities in Humboldt County, Iowa
Cities in Kossuth County, Iowa
1880 establishments in Iowa
Populated places established in 1880